Slipknot (Christopher Weiss) is a supervillain, published by DC Comics. Created by Gerry Conway and Rafael Kayanan, the character made his first appearance in The Fury of Firestorm #28 (October 1984).

Adam Beach portrays Slipknot in the DC Extended Universe film Suicide Squad.

Fictional character biography
Slipknot works for a chemical company in the southern United States, where he develops his formula for the durable ropes he would later use as Slipknot.

Slipknot's first appearance, when he is hired by the villain Multiplex to attack Lorraine Reilly/Firehawk (The Fury of Firestorm #28, October 1984), ends with Slipknot in police custody. He returned from time to time as an antagonist of Firestorm.

Slipknot comes under the attention of the Suicide Squad. They are a varied team, all serving the government for their own reasons. Many members are criminals, who are promised a reduced sentence if they survive their missions, with Slipknot first joining in The Fury of Firestorm #64, October 1987.

Slipknot is taken along when the threat of the Manhunters arises on Earth during the Millennium crisis. A stronghold of Manhunter robots is discovered deep in American swamplands, not far from the Suicide Squad's own base located in the Belle Reve prison. Slipknot and the Squad, including members such as Bronze Tiger, Rick Flag, and Captain Boomerang, are sent in to escort the "Baby Huey" (a car-bomb laced with an experimental high yield explosive) on a search-and-destroy mission. Slipknot discusses the 'arm band bombs' with Captain Boomerang. These deterrent devices are placed on the less trustworthy members and are set to explode if the person goes too far out of range.

Captain Boomerang states that he believes the bombs are fake. This is enough for Slipknot. When he discovers his talent for strangling is useless against robots, he makes a run for it into the swamp. The device begins beeping and flashing an alarm, but Slipknot ignores the warning and once he gets out of range, his left arm is blown off. Boomerang, who had not been sure of the bombs' existence himself, thinks to himself "better you, than me".

Following the success of the mission, in which the Manhunter base is destroyed and the Squad's medic Karin Grace is sacrificed, Slipknot is found, weakened and bleeding but still alive, by Duchess (Lashina in disguise).

In the 2004 miniseries Identity Crisis, Slipknot is in prison, having taken up the Kobra Cult, and the practice of hissing while he talks. He is labeled as the initial suspect of making the attempt on Jean Loring's life, after it is discovered that the knots used on the rope were the ones which used to be Slipknot's trademark. However, when he is later interrogated, he reveals that he has no knowledge of the crime in question, which is later revealed to have been a hoax by Loring herself.

During the 2005 "Infinite Crisis" storyline, it is revealed that Slipknot was captured by OMACs, who have scheduled him and dozens of other supervillains for execution. He escapes when Robin defeats the OMACs, but is quickly captured again and put into U.S. Army custody.

"One Year Later", Slipknot is featured on the cover of Checkmate (vol. 2) #20, but does not appear in the comic's interior.

He appears in the 2009 mini-series Final Crisis Aftermath: Ink fighting the new Tattooed Man, Mark Richards, in league with fellow mercenary Cannon. His right arm, missing from his ill-fated mission with the Suicide Squad, was replaced with a bionic appendage, but the replacement limb was badly damaged while fighting the Tattooed Man. In retaliation, Slipknot killed Richards' son. To gain the Tattooed Man's loyalty to the new villainous version of the Titans, Deathstroke captures Slipknot for the Tattooed Man to kill. The Tattooed Man is able to kill Slipknot after a brutal fight by beheading him with a wire.

In 2011, "The New 52" rebooted the DC universe. During the "Forever Evil" storyline, Slipknot appears as a member of the Crime Syndicate of America's incarnation of the Secret Society of Super Villains.

Slipknot II
An unidentified Slipknot was seen causing havoc in Bludhaven and is defeated by Robin.

Powers and abilities
Slipknot is a master in the use of ropes, including unbreakable ones, and a trained assassin. He created a chemical adhesive which he then applied to his ropes, making them nearly indestructible. Weiss uses the ropes to strangle, grapple, and hold down his opponents. Slipknot is an expert assassin, able to kill swiftly and silently. He is an exceptional martial artist and hand-to-hand combatant.

Other versions
In the alternate timeline of the "Flashpoint" storyline, Slipknot is imprisoned in military Doom prison. During the prison break, a corrections officer, Amazo, breaks Slipknot's arm.

In other media
Slipknot appears in Suicide Squad, portrayed by Adam Beach. This version is a Native American mercenary who is recruited into Amanda Waller's Task Force X to defeat the Enchantress. However, Captain Boomerang tricks him into believing the nano-bombs implanted into the squad members' necks to dissuade them from abandoning the mission are a ruse and Slipknot is subsequently killed while mounting an escape attempt.

References

Characters created by Joey Cavalieri
Characters created by Gerry Conway
Comics characters introduced in 1984
DC Comics supervillains
Suicide Squad members